Garu is a village in Nowshera District in the Khyber Pakhtunkhwa province of Pakistan. It is located at 33°49'0N 71°59'0E with an altitude of 404 metres (1328 feet).

References

Populated places in Nowshera District